Turkish Fragments, Op. 62 is an orchestral suite written in 1930 by Russian composer Mikhail Ippolitov-Ivanov and published in 1931. This suite is sometimes titled as Orchestral Suite No. 3, even though there is no official numbering. This work for large orchestra was dedicated to Shevket Mamedova, an Azerbaijani soprano.

Structure 

This suite has four movements and would take approximately 15 minutes to perform. The movements are listed as follows:

 I. Caravan (Караван)
 II. At Rest (У становища)
 III. Night (Ночью)
 IV. Festival (На празднике)

All of the movements use material drawn from Azerbaijani, Turkish, Uzbek and Kazakh folk music. The Turkish fragments contain dominant chimes strings and beats. The Caravan has a steady ambitious beat and a characteristic Turkish melody that goes on for the entire piece and the loudest of all the Fragments. At Rest is rhythmic but tranquil, with a central section of a livelier nature. Night is a peaceful, more quiet part and respects its name; it has plenty of Turkish melodies and also has a central, livelier section. Festival closes this suite. It consists of a dance, sounds upbeat and at times peaceful.

Notable recordings 

Notable recordings of this suite include:

References

Compositions by Mikhail Ippolitov-Ivanov
1930 compositions
Compositions for symphony orchestra
Orchestral suites
Music with dedications